David Anwyll Coleman (born 1946) is a demographer and anthropologist who served as the Professor of Demography at the Department of Social Policy and Intervention, University of Oxford from October 2002 until 2013, and a lecturer since 1980.

Early life 
Coleman was born in 1946 in London, England. He was educated at Saint Benedict's School, Ealing.

Career 
Between 1985 and 1987 he worked for the British Government, as the Special Adviser to Home Secretary Douglas Hurd and then to the Ministers of Housing and of the Environment.  He is a former fellow of St John's College, Oxford.

University education 
In 1967, Coleman graduated from Oxford University with a Bachelor of Arts in Zoology. In 1978, Coleman graduated from the London School of Economics with a Ph.D. in Demography.

Coleman has published over 90 papers and eight books and was the joint editor of the European Journal of Population from 1992 to 2000. In 1997 he was elected to the Council of the International Union for the Scientific Study of Population. He is also an advisor to Migration Watch UK which he helped to found, and is a member of the Galton Institute, formerly known as the Eugenics Society.

In 2013, Coleman's analysis said that White British people would be a minority in the UK around 2066 if current immigration trends continued.

References

Living people
People educated at St Benedict's School, Ealing
Fellows of St John's College, Oxford
British demographers
Place of birth missing (living people)
1946 births